Mike Parisy (born 8 October 1984 in Pau) is a French racing driver, who formerly competed in the FIA GT1 World Championship. In 2015 he is racing in the Blancpain GT Series for HTP Motorsport in a Bentley Continental.

Career
After karting, Parisy began racing in single-seaters in French Formula Renault in 2001. In 2004 he won the Formula France title. In 2005 he raced in the Eurocup Mégane Trophy, before switching to the Porsche Carrera Cup France for 2006. He finished fourth in his first season, before finishing fifth, second and fifth again in the subsequent races. In 2008 and 2009 he also raced in the French GT Championship, coming third in the GT3 category in 2008 before winning the class the following year. In 2010 he raced in the FIA GT3 European Championship, driving a Graff Racing Corvette Z06R. He and teammate Joakim Lambotte finished the year third in the standings. The team changed to a Mercedes-Benz SLS AMG for 2011, and Parisy finished runner-up.

In 2012 Parisy is racing in the FIA GT1 World Championship in a Porsche 997 GT3-R for Exim Bank Team China, run by Mühlner Motorsport.

Racing record

FIA GT competition results

GT1 World Championship results

FIA GT Series results

24 Hours of Le Mans results

References

External links
 

1984 births
Living people
Sportspeople from Pau, Pyrénées-Atlantiques
French racing drivers
French Formula Renault 2.0 drivers
Formula Renault Eurocup drivers
Eurocup Mégane Trophy drivers
FIA GT1 World Championship drivers
Blancpain Endurance Series drivers
ADAC GT Masters drivers
European Le Mans Series drivers
24 Hours of Le Mans drivers
24 Hours of Spa drivers
Sébastien Loeb Racing drivers
Graff Racing drivers
ART Grand Prix drivers
Saintéloc Racing drivers
GT4 European Series drivers